The International Typeface Corporation (ITC) was a type manufacturer founded in New York in 1970 by Aaron Burns, Herb Lubalin and Edward Rondthaler. The company was one of the world's first type foundries to have no history in the production of metal type. It is now a wholly owned brand or subsidiary of Monotype Imaging.

History
The company was founded to design, license and market typefaces for filmsetting and computer set types internationally. The company issued both new designs and revivals of older or classic faces, invariably re-cut to be suitable for digital typesetting use and produced in families of different weights. Although it is claimed that the designers took care to preserve the style and character of the original typefaces, several ITC revivals, such as ITC Bookman and ITC Garamond in particular, have received criticism that the end result was related in name only to the original faces. Among the company's notable type designers was Ed Benguiat, the creator of Tiffany and Benguiat fonts.

ITC's revival designs frequently followed a formulary of increased x-height, multiple weights from light to ultra bold, multiple widths and unusual ligature combinations, sometimes with alternate characters. Critics sometimes complain that, while the dramatically higher x-height increased legibility in smaller point sizes, in normal text sizes the extreme height of the lowercase characters imparted a commercial, subjective voice to texts. In recent years several new revivals have been praised for showing more historical accuracy, and for not increasing the x-height to the dramatic heights of earlier ITC typeface revivals.

Fonts

ITC American Typewriter
ITC Anna
ITC Arecibo
ITC Arid
ITC Atelier Sans
ITC Avant Garde Gothic
Avenida
ITC Ballerino
ITC Barcelona
ITC Batak
ITC Bauhaus
ITC Beesknees
ITC Benguiat and Benguiat Gothic
ITC Berranger Hand
ITC Better
ITC Binary
ITC Blair
ITC Blackadder
ITC Black Tulip
ITC Blaze
ITC Bodoni
ITC Bolt
ITC Bookman
ITC Bradley Hand
ITC Braganza
ITC Busorama
ITC Caslon 
ITC Century type family
ITC Cerigo
ITC Charter
ITC Cheltenham
ITC Chivalry
ITC Conduit
ITC Cushing
ITC Dartangnon
Data 70
ITC Django
ITC Edwardian Script
ITC Elan
ITC Ellipse
ITC Eras
Eras Demi ITC
ITC Esprit
ITC Fenice
ITC Flora
ITC Fontoon
ITC Forkbeard
ITC Franklin Gothic
ITC Freestyle Script
ITC Friz Quadrata
ITC Garamond
ITC Gamma
Gigi
ITC Giovanni
ITC Golden Cockerel
ITC Golden Type
ITC Goudy Sans
ITC Grimshaw Hand
ITC Handel Gothic
ITC Highlander
ITC Humana Sans
ITC Isadora
ITC Jokerman Hellenic
ITC Johnston
ITC Juanita
ITC Juice
ITC Kabel
ITC Kahana
ITC Keefbats
ITC Kendo
ITC Klepto
ITC Kloegirl
ITC Korigan
ITC Korinna
ITC Kristen
ITC Leawood
ITC Legacy Sans and Serif
ITC Lubalin Graph
ITC Luna
ITC Machine
ITC Matisse
ITC Mendoza Roman
ITC Migration Sans
ITC Mixage
ITC Modern No. 216
ITC Mona Lisa
ITC Motter Corpus
ITC Musclehead
Neue Aachen
ITC New Baskerville
ITC Newtext
ITC New Winchester
ITC Novarese
ITC Obelisk
ITC Obliqua
ITC Officina Sans and Serif
ITC Ozwald
ITC Panache
Papyrus
ITC Pioneer
ITC Pious Henry
ITC Plaza
ITC Portago
ITC Quay Sans
ITC Quorum
Rage
ITC Redonda
ITC Ronda
ITC Serif Gothic
ITC Slimbach
ITC Souvenir
ITC Snap
ITC Stenberg
ITC Stone Sans
ITC Stone Informal
ITC Stylus
ITC Symbol
ITC Tabula
ITC Tetra
ITC Tiepolo
ITC Tiffany
ITC Tempus Sans
ITC University of California Old Style
ITC Usherwood
ITC Veljovic
ITC Vineyard
ITC Vintage
ITC Weber Hand
ITC Weidemann
ITC William Hamilton Page
ITC Willow
ITC Zapf Chancery
ITC Zapf Dingbats
ITC Zemke Hand

U&lc magazine

The company published U&lc (Upper and Lower Case), a typographic magazine dedicated to showcasing their traditional and newer typefaces in particularly creative ways, originally edited and designed by Herb Lubalin until his death in May, 1981. Because of its extraordinary blend of typographic design, illustration and cartoons (sometimes by world-renowned artists and cartoonists such as Lou Myers), verse and prose extolling the virtues of well-designed type, as well as contributions by amateur or semi-professional typographers, the magazine was avidly read by type enthusiasts and sought after by collectors the world over.

A web version of the magazine started in 1998, along with a brand-new sans-serif logo by Mark van Bronkhorst (replacing the famous swash lettered logo by Herb Lubalin). In an editorial, John D. Berry wrote: "There’ll be plenty of overlap between the print magazine and the online magazine, but they won’t be identical: some things are best done with ink on paper, others are best done on screen." Yet the paper edition, which in 1998 had shrunk in format from tabloid pages to 8.5" x 11", did not survive for long. The final printed edition was vol. 26 no. 2, dated fall 1999. The last numbered U&lc issue is 42.1.1, issued in 2010.

A book celebrating U&lc, U&lc: Influencing Design & Typography by John D. Berry (the magazine's final editor) , was published by Mark Batty in 2005.

In October 2010 Allan Haley announced on the Fonts.com blog that the complete run of U&lc had been digitized and would be made available, one year's worth per month, via PDF download from that same blog.

As part of Fonts.com redesign in 2012, access to U&lc were moved to fonts.com blog, and Learn About Fonts & Typography for various U&lc web edition articles.

Acquisitions and mergers
In 1986 the company was acquired by Esselte Letraset, who had taken over Letraset, originally makers of the first dry transfer lettering, and later to become developers of new typefaces for filmsetting and computer applications. In 2000, Agfa Monotype Corporation announced the acquisition of the capital stock of International Typeface Corporation (ITC) from Esselte. The transaction included ITC’s complete library of over 1600 typefaces, all typeface subscriber and distributor agreements, the itcfonts.com Web site, and typographic software. At this point ITC ceased to operate as an independent entity.

In November 2005 Agfa Monotype was incorporated as Monotype Imaging, with a focus on the company's traditional core competencies of typographic design and professional printing. Famous contemporary typographers associated with Monotype include Adrian Frutiger, Hermann Zapf and Matthew Carter.

References
Blackwell, Lewis. 20th Century Type. Yale University Press: 2004. .
Fiedl, Frederich, Nicholas Ott and Bernard Stein. Typography: An Encyclopedic Survey of Type Design and Techniques Through History. Black Dog & Leventhal: 1998. .

External links

ITC homepage
Monotype Imaging

Type foundries
Design companies established in 1970
Design companies disestablished in 1986
1970 establishments in New York (state)
1986 disestablishments in New York (state)